Andy Duncan may refer to:

Andy Duncan (footballer, born 1911) (1911–1983), Scottish footballer (Dumbarton, Hull City, Tottenham Hotspur and Chelmsford City)
Andy Duncan (basketball) (1922–2006), American basketball player
Andy Duncan (businessman) (born 1962), British businessman, former chief executive of Channel 4
Andy Duncan (writer) (born 1964), American science fiction writer
Andy Duncan (musician) (born 1975), American guitarist and keyboardist, member of the band OK Go
Andy Duncan (footballer, born 1977), English footballer

See also
Andrew Duncan (disambiguation)